LibreTexts (formerly called STEMHyperlibrary and ChemWiki) is a 501(c)(3) nonprofit online educational resource project. The project provides open access to its content on its website, and the site is built on the Mindtouch platform. LibreTexts was started in 2008 by Professor Delmar Larsen at the University of California Davis and has since expanded to 400 texts in 154 courses (as of 2018), making it one of the largest and most visited online educational resources. LibreTexts currently has 13 library disciplines.

Support 
LibreTexts' current primary support is from the 2018 Open Textbook Pilot Program award from the Department of Education Organization Act. FIPSE Other funding comes from the University of California Davis, the University of California Davis Library, and the California State University System both through MERLOT and its Affordable Learning Solutions (AL$) program.

References 

Creative Commons-licensed works
501(c)(3) organizations
Open educational resources
American educational websites